Moon Rock For Monday is a 2022 Australian independent film. The film was written and directed by Kurt Martin and produced by Jim Robison. It stars Australian actors George Pullar, Nicholas Hope, Alan Dukes, Aaron Jeffery, Jessica Napier, David Field, Maha Wilson, Rahel Romahn,  Bonnie Ferguson, Karina Banno, Kai Lewins, Dean Kyrwood, Suzan Mutesi and Ashlyn Louden-Gamble. 

It was nominated for an AACTA Award in 2021 for Best Indie Film by the Australian Academy of Cinema Television and Arts.  of Lunar Pictures released in 2021. 

Prior to being released the film appeared in several international film festivals including Beijing International Film Festival, Zurich Film Festival, Adelaide Film Festival, CinefestOz, Busan International Kids and Youth Film Festival and Schlingel International Film Festival in Germany where it won both the FIPRESCI Jury Award and the SLM Top Award.

References

Australian independent films
2022 independent films